is a Japanese voice actress. Her best-known roles are as title characters in Croket!, Noramimi, and as well the lead role of Ahiru Arima from Princess Tutu.

Filmography
 Fancy Lala (1998), Boy (ep 19), Classmate (ep 7), Old Woman (ep 18), Student (ep 1), Student (2) (ep 10)
 Eat-Man '98 (1998), Alex
 Magic User's Club (1999), Madoka Masuko
 EX-Driver (2000)
 Inuyasha (2000), Child (Ep 162)
 Shiawase Sou no Okojo-san (2001), Yuuta Kudoo
 Kirby: Right Back at Ya! (2001), Tiff
 Magical Play (2001), Mustard
 Magical Play 3D (2001), Mustard
 UFO Ultramaiden Valkyrie (2002), Maid D
 Shrine of the Morning Mist (2002), Chika Yurikasa
 Princess Tutu (2002), Ahiru/Princess Tutu
 Pokémon Advance (2002), Pacchiru (ep 57)
 Croquette! (2003), Croquette
 Godannar (2003), Hayashi
 The Galaxy Railways (2003), Sarai (ep 9)
 Peacemaker (2003), Hana
 Rockman.EXE Stream (2004), Hazuki Yui
 Agatha Christie's Great Detectives Poirot and Marple (2004), Annie
 Kujibiki Unbalance (2004), Kenji Suzuki
 Transformers: Cybertron (2005), Skids
 Shakugan no Shana (2005), Domino
 Animal Yokocho (2005), Macchi
 Bakegyamon (2006), Mikiharu Kawaguchi, Theme Song Performance (ED2)
 Kamichama Karin (2007), Shii-chan/Nike
 Shakugan no Shana Second (2007), Domino
 Tamagotchi! (2007), Kuromametchi
 Shugo Chara! (2007), Miki
 Inazuma Eleven (2008), Kakeru Megane
 Noramimi (2008), Noramimi
 Shugo Chara!! Doki— (2008), Miki
 Hayate the Combat Butler!! (2009), Lost Children B
 Yuri's World (2017), Bird

Trivia
 Princess Tutu creator Ikuko Itoh had chosen Katō as the voice of Ahiru long before animation production had begun on the series.

References

External links

Nanae Katō at Ryu's Seiyuu Infos
 Nanae Katō at GamePlaza-Haruka Voice Acting Database 
 Nanae Katō at Hitoshi Doi's Seiyuu Database 

1976 births
Voice actresses from Ibaraki Prefecture
Living people
Japanese voice actresses